Capilla del Sauce is a small town in the north part of Florida Department of central Uruguay.

Geography

History
The group of houses of this area was declared a village on 26 May 1924, by decree Ley N° 7.718. On 5 July 1956, its status was elevated to "Villa" (town) by decree Ley N° 12.298.

Population
In 2011 Capilla del Sauce had a population of 835.
 
Source: Instituto Nacional de Estadística de Uruguay

Places of worship
 Parish Church of Our Lady of Mt. Carmel (Roman Catholic)

References

External links
INE map of Capilla del Sauce and Estación Capilla del Sauce

Populated places in the Florida Department